Roosevelt Middle School may refer to several middle schools in the United States:

 Roosevelt Middle School (Albuquerque, New Mexico)
 Roosevelt Middle School (Bellwood, Illinois)
 Roosevelt Middle School (Eugene, Oregon)
 Roosevelt Middle School (Milwaukee, Wisconsin)
 Roosevelt Middle School (Oakland, California)
 Roosevelt Middle School (River Forest, Illinois)
 Roosevelt Middle School (San Diego, California)
 Roosevelt Middle School (San Francisco, California)
 Roosevelt Middle School (West Orange, New Jersey)

See also
 Roosevelt Elementary School (disambiguation)
 Roosevelt High School (disambiguation)
 Roosevelt Intermediate School
 Roosevelt Junior High School (disambiguation)
 Roosevelt School (disambiguation)